Phoenix Bypass Route is a bypass route of Phoenix, Arizona. It consists the following segments:

 Arizona State Route 85, from Interstate 10 near Phoenix to Interstate 8 in Gila Bend
 Interstate 8, from Arizona State Route 85 to Interstate 10

Interstate 8